Michael John Gaule (August 4, 1869 – January 24, 1918) was an American professional baseball player. He played in one game for the Louisville Colonels of the American Association in 1889.

A local semi-pro player who had played a couple of seasons of minor league baseball, Gaule served as a replacement player when several members of the Colonels refused to play in protest of owner Mordecai Davidson's failure to pay them. He was born in Baltimore, Maryland and died there at the age of 48.

External links

Major League Baseball outfielders
Louisville Colonels players
Savannah (minor league baseball) players
Shamokin Maroons players
Baseball players from Baltimore
1869 births
1918 deaths
19th-century baseball players